Kevin Gafford Ritz is an American lawyer who has served as the United States attorney for the Western District of Tennessee since September 2022.

Education

Ritz received a Bachelor of Arts from the University of Virginia in 1997, a Master of Science from Georgetown University in 1999 and a Juris Doctor from the University of Virginia School of Law in 2004.

Career

From 2004 to 2005, Ritz served as a law clerk for Judge Julia Smith Gibbons of the United States Court of Appeals for the Sixth Circuit. In 2005, he became an assistant United States attorney in the United States Attorney's office for the Western District of Tennessee. Ritz worked as a prosecutor in gun-related crimes before moving to appeals later in his career. He appeared as counsel in United States v. Castleman.

U.S. attorney 
On July 29, 2022, President Joe Biden announced his intent to nominate Ritz to be the United States attorney for the Western District of Tennessee. On August 1, 2022, his nomination was sent to the United States Senate, and the nomination was confirmed on September 22, 2022, by voice vote. Ritz was sworn in by Chief U.S. District Court Judge S. Thomas Anderson on September 28, 2022.

References

Living people
Year of birth missing (living people)
Place of birth missing (living people)
21st-century American lawyers
American prosecutors
Assistant United States Attorneys
Georgetown University Law Center alumni
Tennessee lawyers
University of Virginia alumni